Joseph Clement Willging (September 6, 1884 – March 3, 1959) was an American prelate of the Roman Catholic Church. He served as the first bishop of the new Diocese of Pueblo in Colorado from 1942 until his death in 1959.

Biography

Early life 
Joseph Willging was born on September 6, 1884, in Dubuque, Iowa, to Henry and Elizabeth (née Hanover) Willging. He attended St. Mary's School (1891–1898) and Columbia College (1898–1905) in Dubuque.  Willging then went to Baltimore, Maryland, to study at St. Mary's Seminary, earning a Bachelor of Sacred Theology degree in 1908.

Priesthood 
Willging was ordained to the priesthood in Baltimore by Cardinal James Gibbons for the Diocese of Helena on June 20, 1908. He then studied at Catholic University of America in Washington, D.C., for a year.  Returning to Montana, Willging was appointed principal of St. Aloysius Institute in Helena, in 1909. He taught at Carroll College in Helena from 1910 to 1914, returning during that period to Catholic University for one year. Willging then served as chancellor of the diocese until 1927, when he became pastor of Immaculate Conception Parish in Butte, Montana. Willging was named a papal chamberlain (1921), a domestic prelate and the vicar general of Helena in 1939.

Bishop of Pueblo 
On December 6, 1941, Willging was appointed the first bishop of the Diocese of Pueblo by Pope Pius XII. He received his episcopal consecration on February 24, 1942, from Archbishop Amleto Cicognani, with Archbishop Henry Rohlman and Bishop Joseph Michael Gilmore serving as co-consecrators. During his 17-year-long tenure, Willging increased the number of parishes from 39 to 60, and the number of priests from 84 to 151. He also encouraged the establishment of parochial schools and Catholic hospitals.

Joseph Willging died of a heart attack at St. Thomas Seminary in Denver, Colorado, on March 3, 1959, at age 74.

References

1884 births
1959 deaths
People from Dubuque, Iowa
Roman Catholic Archdiocese of Dubuque
Roman Catholic bishops of Pueblo
20th-century Roman Catholic bishops in the United States
St. Mary's Seminary and University alumni
Catholic University of America alumni
Carroll College (Montana)
Religious leaders from Iowa
Catholics from Iowa
American school principals